Entrama is a Chilean music group that since its inception in 1997 develops instrumental music, fusing styles such as Latin American music of folkloric origin (or Latin American fusion), with jazz and classical music, mainly using compositional techniques derived from the latter. It has also been cataloged as World Music. According to the specialized critics they have been called as popular musicians for refined and demanding listeners.

History 
In October 1997 they made their first concert at the Teatro Universidad de Chile. Then the label Mundo Vivo proposes the recording of the first album, a project that took form in March 1998.

The year 1998 culminates with three important recognitions: The SCD (Chilean Copyright Society) grants Entrama the award -now recognized as Pulsar- for the interpretation as Best Group in the Jazz Fusión genre; and two of its members: Juan Antonio Sánchez and Manuel Meriño, are awarded as the best composer and best acoustic guitar player, respectively.

In 1999 Entrama composes the incidental music for the documentary about the work of the Chilean painter Roberto Matta, entitled "A century of mind", interview that was made by the Chilean intellectual Volodia Teitelboim. In 2001 they obtained a Fondart (Fund for the Development of Culture and the Arts) to finance the production of his second record material and thus originates Centro, album that remains in the same instrumental line that characterizes them.

During 2003 they perform a Concert with the Symphony Orchestra of the Universidad de Concepción, where they present orchestral arrangements of compositions belonging to their two previous recordings: Entrama and Centro. This experience gave rise to his third record production entitled Simbólico "Symbolic", published in April 2005 thanks to the support of Fondart and which constitutes an important moment for the musical development for the group as it proposes a new format that enhances the sound possibilities of the group when inserted in a symphonic context.

In May 2012 they present their new album Año luz (light year) after seven years without producing a record. The album features 2 songs, for the first time with voices with lyrics, and a major use of piano than the previous albums.

They have made international tours to Canada (2006), Perú (2011), and Argentina (2014).

The depth of Entrama’s musical and instrumental quest makes possible the creation of a musical weave (as the word ‘Entrama’ implies) whose threads transform this music band in a bridge between Latin-American folk, popular, classical, jazz, and world music.

Influences 
Among his main influences are  Congreso, Víctor Jara, Inti-Illimani,  Violeta Parra, Los Jaivas, Horacio Salinas, Tilo González, Roberto Márquez, Antonio Restucci, Luis Advis, Latinomusicaviva, Silvio Rodríguez, Leo Brouwer, Egberto Gismonti, Hermeto Pascoal, Heitor Villa-Lobos, Chico Buarque, Caetano Veloso, Jacques Morelembaum, Astor Piazzolla, Flairck, Ralph Towner, Pat Metheny, Paco de Lucía, Dino Saluzzi, Gurrufío, Editus, The Beatles, Sting, Bach, Satie, Ravel, Stravinsky, and many more.

Members

Current 
 Pedro Suau, (1997–present) direction, quena, flute, zampoña and tarka
 Rodrigo Durán, (1997–present) cello
 Carlos Basilio, (1997–present) percussion
 Daniel Delgado, (1998–present) guitar, percussion and accordion
 Marcelo Arenas, (2000–present) batería
 Guillermo Correa, (2001–present) guitar and mandolin
 Sebastián Iglesias, (2001–present) bass
 Juan Antonio Sanchez (1997–2001, 2017–present) guitar

Past 
 Manuel Meriño, (1997–2001) guitarra
 Ítalo Pedrotti, (1997–2006) charango
 Pedro Melo, (1997–2014) bajo, flauta, teclado

Discography 
 Entrama (Mundovivo 1998),
 Centro (Prod. Independiente 2001)
 Simbólico (Mundovivo 2005).
 Año Luz (2012).
 El fuego de la memoria Vol. I (Mundovivo June 2022).
 El fuego de la memoria Vol. II (Mundovivo October 2022).

References 

Musical groups established in 1997
Chilean jazz fusion bands